The Gamma-Ray Burst Optical/Near-Infrared Detector (GROND) is an imaging instrument used to investigate Gamma-Ray Burst afterglows and for doing follow-up observations on exoplanets using transit photometry. It is operated at the 2.2-metre MPG/ESO telescope at ESO's La Silla Observatory in the southern part of the Atacama desert, about 600 kilometres north of Santiago de Chile and at an altitude of 2,400 metres.

Discoveries 
 On 13 September 2008, Swift detected gamma-ray burst 080913. GROND and VLT subsequently placed the GRB at 12.8 Gly distant, making it the most-distant GRB observed, as well as the second-most-distant object to be spectroscopically confirmed.

 On 15 September 2008, NASA's Fermi Gamma-ray Space Telescope detected gamma-ray burst 080916C. On 19 February 2009, NASA announced that the GROND team's work shows that the GRB was the most energetic yet observed, and 12.2 Gly distant.

See also
 Red shift observations in astronomy
 Photometry (astronomy)
 Max Planck Institute for Extraterrestrial Physics

References

External links 
  GROND page at the Max Planck Institute for Extraterrestrial Physics

Optical telescopes
Gamma-ray bursts